Modigs is a Swedish surname.

Notable people
Johan Modig (born 1977), Swedish orienteering competitor
Marcus Modigs (born 1992), Swedish professional ice hockey player
Mattias Modig (born 1987), Swedish professional ice hockey player
Mattias Modig (born 1989), Swedish professional seller and businessman